Qingdao railway station is a railway station in Qingdao, Shandong, in the People's Republic of China.

As a time-honoured station of Qingdao, more than 100 regular passenger trains (denoted with letter Z/T/K, or no letter), initially scheduled CRH trains (denoted with letter G/D) and some intercity CRH trains (denoted with letter C)  arrive and depart daily. Limited by a relatively small number of platforms, most newly scheduled trains eventually will not stop here, instead, terminating at the larger Qingdao North railway station.
There are also trains that stop at both Qingdao North and Qingdao stations.

History
The station first opened in 1901. In the years leading up to the 2008 Summer Olympics, the station underwent a significant renovation in order to accommodate increased passenger traffic for the Olympic period and afterwards. The new station is an example of German architectural traits incorporated into a Chinese-designed building, which is consistent with many structures in Qingdao.

On 28 October 2022, the station was closed to allow for renovation of the platform canopy. Passenger services are calling at Qingdao North railway station instead. The station is expected to reopen on 16 January 2023.

Qingdao Metro

Qingdao Railway Station is a station on Line 1 and Line 3 of the Qingdao Metro. It opened on 18 December 2016. It is located in Shinan District and it serves Qingdao railway station.

Gallery

References

External links

Qingdao Railway Station 

Railway stations in Shandong
Railway stations in China opened in 1901
Transport in Qingdao
Qingdao Metro stations
Stations on the Qingdao–Taiyuan High-Speed Railway
Stations on the Qingdao–Jinan passenger railway